The Glencove Hotel is a former hotel in Glencove, Washington. It was built in 1897 by Hans Nicholas and Agnes Petersen. The hotel contained six guest rooms and three floors, but was converted to a private residence in 1930. It is currently run as a bed and breakfast.

The building was added to the National Register of Historic Places in 1978.

References

Sources
Findlay, Jean Cammon; Paterson, Robin (2008). Mosquito Fleet of South Puget Sound, Arcadia Publishing.
Slater, Colleen A. (2007). The Key Peninsula, Arcadia Publishing.

National Register of Historic Places in Pierce County, Washington
Hotel buildings completed in 1896
Buildings and structures in Pierce County, Washington
Bed and breakfasts in Washington (state)
Hotel buildings on the National Register of Historic Places in Washington (state)